Party of Nationalists or Nationalists' Party was a conservative political party in Pahlavi era Iran, and government majority party from 1957 to 1960. The party was founded in 1957 by Manouchehr Eghbal on orders directed by Shah to initiate a two-party system. Its opposition was liberal People's Party.

The party's name was deliberately chosen in a way to confuse the public, because the term Melliun was already in use to refer to members of the opposition National Front and other followers of Mohammad Mossadegh.

Electoral history

References 

1957 establishments in Iran
Political parties established in 1957
Monarchist parties in Iran
Political parties in Pahlavi Iran (1941–1979)
Conservative parties in Iran